The Two Faces of January is a 2014 thriller film written and directed by Hossein Amini, in his feature film directorial debut. It is based on Patricia Highsmith's 1964 novel The Two Faces of January and stars Viggo Mortensen, Kirsten Dunst and Oscar Isaac.

Filming took place on location in Greece and Turkey, and at Ealing Studios in London. It premiered in February 2014 in the Berlinale Special Galas section of the 64th Berlin International Film Festival.

Plot
In 1962, New York con man Chester MacFarland (Mortensen) and his wife Colette are touring Greece. At the Acropolis, they meet Rydal Keener, an American who is alienated from his family and who refused to attend his father's funeral in the US. Rydal scams tourists while working as a tour guide in Athens. The MacFarlands invite him to dinner. Rydal, intrigued by the couple's wealth and Colette's beauty, accepts their invitation and brings along a girlfriend.

Colette likes Rydal but Chester does not trust him. After dinner they part, but Rydal goes back to their hotel to return a bracelet that Colette left in their shared taxi. Meanwhile, a private detective hired by victims of Chester's investment swindles visits the MacFarlands' hotel room and demands that Chester repay their money. The detective pulls a gun, but Chester accidentally kills him after a struggle in which the detective falls and hits his head. As Chester is carrying the body to the detective's hotel room, Rydal finds him in the corridor. Chester tells Rydal that the detective is unconscious and asks for help, explaining that the detective had threatened him, that he owes people money, and that he and Colette are in danger. They hastily pack their suitcases and flee the hotel with Rydal but without checking out, leaving their passports at the front desk.

Rydal takes Chester to a friend who can furnish false passports to replace those left behind at the hotel. Rydal suggests waiting for the counterfeit documents in Crete. In the capital city Iraklion, they cannot check into a hotel without identification and so they spend the evening at a restaurant, where Chester gets drunk while watching Rydal and Colette dance. They all sleep on the quayside until the morning, when a bus leaves for Chania, where they check into a small hotel that is less strict about ID. With the story of the dead detective in newspapers and on the radio, Rydal encourages Chester to turn himself in, but Chester refuses. Colette visits Rydal's room while her husband sleeps and they go out; when Chester awakens he becomes suspicious, gets drunk, pursues them, and reveals to his wife that he killed the detective. On the way back to Iraklion, Colette believes someone has recognized her from newspaper pictures; she runs off the bus at a stop. Chester and Rydal follow and together they walk to the ruins of Knossos.

It begins to rain and they seek shelter. Chester lures Rydal into an underground labyrinth and knocks him out. When Chester emerges alone, Colette assumes that he has killed Rydal. She refuses to go any further with Chester, but he tries to force her, grabbing her arm. As she struggles, she loses her balance and falls from a flight of stairs. Chester rushes down to her but she is dead. He takes her in his arms and cries out in grief.

When Rydal comes to in the morning, he discovers Colette's dead body and is seen by a group of students and their guide as he leaves. Chester has rushed to Iraklion to pick up the passports from Rydal's friend. Rydal tracks down Chester on a ferry back to Athens. The two realize that they are bound together by two deaths. If either man is arrested, he will implicate the other. Chester offers Rydal $10,000 to keep quiet. Rydal says that he never wanted Chester's money; rather, he wanted Chester's wife. Chester grabs him by the throat and nearly pushes him overboard as he warns him to never mention his wife again. Arriving in Athens, they head to the airport, where Chester pretends to buy them both tickets to Frankfurt. He says he is going for a drink, then boards a plane to Istanbul, leaving Rydal with a suitcase containing documents that tie him to Colette.

Rydal locates Chester in Istanbul and telephones him, demanding a meeting in the Grand Bazaar and threatening to go to the police unless Chester pays him off. Unbeknownst to Chester, Rydal has already been arrested by an FBI agent who demands that Rydal wear a wire and extract a confession from Chester. At their rendezvous, Rydal's questioning makes Chester suspicious. Sensing a trap, he flees and a chase ensues with both Chester and Rydal running from the FBI agent and Turkish police. A policeman shoots Chester who, as he lies dying, confesses to Rydal his responsibility for both deaths. After Rydal is exonerated and released, the agent tells him that Chester will be buried in Istanbul. Rydal attends his funeral and buries Colette's bracelet at Chester's grave.

Cast
 Viggo Mortensen as Chester MacFarland
 Kirsten Dunst as Colette MacFarland
 Oscar Isaac as Rydal Keener
 Yigit Ozsener as Yahya
 Daisy Bevan as Lauren
 David Warshofsky as Paul Vittorio
 Omiros Poulakis as Niko

Production
Hossein Amini wrote the screenplay, which also marks his directorial debut; Amini said he had wanted to direct a film adaptation of the novel for the past 15 years. Amini's screenplay is based on the 1964 novel of the same name by Patricia Highsmith. He wrote:

What I love about Highsmith is the way that she puts us in the shoes of traditionally 'unlikeable' characters, often criminals, and then makes us not only understand their motivations but recognize something of ourselves in them... It was this type of connection that drew me to Chester MacFarland,... a jealous, alcoholic conman who is nevertheless a deeply tragic figure. His journey of murder, flight and redemption made him an unforgettable character for me and one of the main reasons I wanted to turn the novel into a film.
 
Producer Tom Sternberg optioned the rights to the novel and originally set up a project with the production company Mirage. Sternberg developed the project with Amini and it found the backing by StudioCanal and Working Title.

Principal photography began August 2012 in Athens, Crete, Istanbul, and London's Ealing Studios. Identifiable locations include the Küçük Hasan mosque on Chania harbour, a nearby café and the Grand Arsenal in Plateia Katehaki, the ruins of Knossos near Iraklion, and the Grand Bazaar in Istanbul.

Release
StudioCanal distributed the film in the United Kingdom, Germany, France, Australia, and New Zealand, and Universal Studios distributed it in Spain and Scandinavia; the latter sold distribution rights for other territories. Entertainment One acquired rights for Canada. Magnolia Pictures picked up distribution rights for the United States and released the film via VOD on August 28, 2014, to be followed by a theatrical release on October 3, 2014.

Reception
The Two Faces of January received mostly positive reviews; it holds an 79% rating based on 124 reviews on review aggregator website Rotten Tomatoes, with an average score of 6.75/10. The consensus states: "With striking visuals, complex characters, and Hitchcockian plot twists, The Two Faces of January offers a pleasantly pungent treat for fans of romantic thrillers." On Metacritic, the film has a 66/100 rating from 30 critics, indicating "generally favorable reviews".  Peter DeBruge of Variety wrote that Amini "expertly blends touches of Hitchcock and Highsmith".  In comparing it to The Talented Mr. Ripley, Deborah Young of The Hollywood Reporter said that it lacks the "joie de vivre" of that film, but has lush cinematography and shows Amini's "skill at working with actors".  Manohla Dargis of The New York Times wrote, "Mr. Amini adds embellishing details and plot layers, hints at a grave Oedipal disturbance, turns up the sexual heat and smoothly increases the narrative torque."  Betsy Sharkey of the Los Angeles Times wrote, "As was the case in the book, there are moves that don't always make sense, but the game-playing is riveting."

See also

 2014 in film
 List of American films of 2014
 List of British films of 2014
 List of French films of 2014

References

External links
 
 
 
 

2014 films
2014 thriller films
American thriller films
British thriller films
French thriller films
2010s Greek-language films
2010s Turkish-language films
Films based on American thriller novels
Films based on works by Patricia Highsmith
Films about con artists
Films set in Athens
Films set in Crete
Films set in Istanbul
Films shot in Athens
Films shot in Crete
Films shot in Istanbul
StudioCanal films
Films with screenplays by Hossein Amini
Films produced by Eric Fellner
Films produced by Tim Bevan
Films scored by Alberto Iglesias
Working Title Films films
English-language French films
2014 directorial debut films
2010s English-language films
2014 multilingual films
American multilingual films
British multilingual films
French multilingual films
2010s American films
2010s British films
2010s French films
Films set in Greece